Satan Speaks! is a book of essays by Anton LaVey, published in 1998 by Feral House following his October 1997 death. It includes a foreword by Marilyn Manson, an introduction by Blanche Barton and cover art by Coop.

References

1998 non-fiction books
Books published posthumously
English-language books
Essay collections
Works by Anton LaVey
Feral House books